Rafael Henriques Vasquez Veloso (born 3 November 1993) is a Portuguese professional footballer who plays as a goalkeeper for Norwegian club FK Gjøvik-Lyn.

Club career
Born in Lourinhã, Lisbon District, Veloso graduated from Sporting CP's youth system, and joined C.F. Os Belenenses for his first year as a senior after a trial in England with Blackburn Rovers. He acted as a backup to Matt Jones during his first season in a promotion to the Primeira Liga, his only appearance coming on 18 May 2013 in a 2−1 home win against S.C. Freamunde where he came on as a late substitute for Filipe Mendes. He added a further two league matches in the top flight, one after replacing sent off Jones early into an eventual 2−3 home loss to C.D. Nacional also at the Estádio do Restelo.

On 25 August 2014, Veloso was loaned to Deportivo de La Coruña's reserves in a season-long deal. He returned to his homeland the following summer, signing with Clube Oriental de Lisboa also on loan.

Veloso left Belenenses in December 2016, after terminating his contract. Afterwards, he competed in Norway with Valdres FK and in Iceland with Íþróttabandalag Vestmannaeyja, on both occasions agreeing to two-year deals.

In January 2020, Veloso moved to 07 Vestur in the Faroese second tier. He returned to Norway one year later, joining third 3. divisjon club FK Gjøvik-Lyn.

Match fixing scandal
On 26 May 2016, Veloso was arrested on suspicion of match fixing whilst at Oriental, which led to him being banned from playing professional football in Portugal.

References

External links

1993 births
Living people
Sportspeople from Lisbon District
Portuguese footballers
Association football goalkeepers
Primeira Liga players
Liga Portugal 2 players
C.F. Os Belenenses players
Clube Oriental de Lisboa players
Tercera División players
Deportivo Fabril players
Íþróttabandalag Vestmannaeyja players
07 Vestur players
Portugal youth international footballers
Portuguese expatriate footballers
Expatriate footballers in Spain
Expatriate footballers in Norway
Expatriate footballers in Iceland
Expatriate footballers in the Faroe Islands
Portuguese expatriate sportspeople in Spain
Portuguese expatriate sportspeople in Norway
Portuguese expatriate sportspeople in Iceland